Offenbach  may refer to:

Places
 Offenbach am Main, a city in Hesse, Germany
 Kickers Offenbach, football club
 VfB 1900 Offenbach, football club
 Offenbach (district), a kreis in Hesse, Germany
 Offenbach an der Queich, a municipality in Südliche Weinstraße, Rhineland-Palatinate, Germany
 Offenbach an der Queich (Verbandsgemeinde), the collective municipality surrounding the town above
 Offenbach-Hundheim, a municipality in Kusel, Rhineland-Palatinate, Germany

People
 Jacques Offenbach (1819–1880), German-born French composer, cellist and impresario
 Isabella Offenbach Maas (1817-1891), Opera singer, pianist and sister of Jacques Offenbach
 John Louis of Isenburg-Offenbach (fl. 1635–1685), German aristocrat

Other uses
 Offenbach (band), Quebec rock band
 10820 Offenbach, a main-belt asteroid
 Offenbach Archival Depot, a post World War II document collection facility
 A typeface created by Rudolf Koch

See also 
 Ofenbach (DJs), French DJs based in Paris
 Ofenbach (Lanzenkirchen), a cadastral community in Austria

Jewish surnames
Yiddish-language surnames